Auti may refer to:

 Auti Angel, American entertainer
 Vijayrao Bhaskarrao Auti, Indian Shiv Sena politician
 Bhaskar Tukaram Auti (fl. 1950s), Indian politician
 ʻAutī, evergreen flowering plant in the Asparagus family

See also
 Audi
 Autti